Amazing is a song by Swedish singer Danny Saucedo which he performed in Melodifestivalen 2012 where it reached the final and finished in second place. It was written by Saucedo himself with Peter Boström and Figge Boström and was released as a digital download on 26 February 2012.

Chart performance
On its release after the last semifinal on February 25, 2012, "Amazing" entered the Swedish Singles Chart at number 20 in its first week of release, and reached number two in its second week. The single subsequently peaked at number two on the chart. The single also entered the Turkish Singles Chart at number 70 for one week.

Charts

References 

Melodifestivalen songs of 2012
Danny Saucedo songs
Songs written by Figge Boström
Songs written by Peter Boström
Songs written by Danny Saucedo
2011 songs
Columbia Records singles